The Wendelstein 7-X (abbreviated W7-X) reactor is an experimental stellarator built in Greifswald, Germany, by the Max Planck Institute for Plasma Physics (IPP), and completed in October 2015. Its purpose is to advance stellarator technology: though this experimental reactor will not produce electricity, it is used to evaluate the main components of a future fusion power plant; it was developed based on the predecessor Wendelstein 7-AS experimental reactor.

, the Wendelstein 7-X reactor is the world's largest stellarator device. After two successful operation phases ending in October 2018, the reactor was taken offline for upgrades. The upgrade completed in 2022. New fusion experiments in February 2023 demonstrated longer confinement and increased power. The goal of this phase is to gradually increase power and duration for up to 30 minutes of continuous plasma discharge, thus demonstrating an essential feature of a future fusion power plant: continuous operation. 

The name of the project, referring to the mountain Wendelstein in Bavaria, was decided at the end of the 1950s, referencing the preceding project from Princeton University under the name Project Matterhorn.

The research facility is an independent partner project of the Max-Planck Institute for Plasma Physics with the University of Greifswald.

Design and main components
The Wendelstein 7-X device is based on a five-field-period Helias configuration. It is mainly a toroid, consisting of 50 non-planar and 20 planar superconducting magnetic coils, 3.5 m high, which induce a magnetic field that prevents the plasma from colliding with the reactor walls. The 50 non-planar coils are used for adjusting the magnetic field. It aims for a plasma density of 3 particles per cubic metre, and a plasma temperature of 60–130 megakelvins (MK).

The main components are the magnetic coils, cryostat, plasma vessel, divertor and heating systems.

The coils (NbTi in aluminium) are arranged around a heat insulating cladding with a diameter of 16 metres, called the cryostat. A cooling device produces enough liquid helium to cool down the magnets and their enclosure (about 425 metric tons of "cold mass") to superconductivity temperature (4 K). The coils will carry 12.8 kA current and create a field of up to 3 teslas.

The plasma vessel, built of 20 parts, is on the inside, adjusted to the complex shape of the magnetic field. It has 254 ports (holes) for plasma heating and observation diagnostics. The whole plant is built of five nearly identical modules, which were assembled in the experiment hall.

The heating system includes high power gyrotrons for electron cyclotron resonance heating (ECRH), which will deliver up to 15 MW of heating to the plasma. For operational phase 2 (OP-2), after completion of the full armor/water-cooling, up to 8 megawatts of neutral beam injection will also be available for 10 seconds. An ion cyclotron resonance heating (ICRH) system will become available for physics operation in OP1.2.

A system of sensors and probes based on a variety of complementary technologies will measure key properties of the plasma, including the profiles of the electron density and of the electron and ion temperature, as well as the profiles of important plasma impurities and of the radial electric field resulting from electron and ion particle transport.

History
The German funding arrangement for the project was negotiated in 1994, establishing the Greifswald Branch Institute of the IPP in the north-eastern corner of the recently integrated East Germany. Its new building was completed in 2000. Construction of the stellarator was originally expected to reach completion in 2006. Assembly began in April 2005. Problems with the coils took about 3 years to fix. The schedule slipped into late 2015.

A three-laboratory American consortium (Princeton, Oak Ridge, and Los Alamos) became a partner in the project, paying €6.8 million of the eventual total cost of €1.06 billion. In 2012, Princeton University and the Max Planck Society announced a new joint research center in plasma physics, to include research on W7-X.

The end of the construction phase, which required more than 1 million assembly hours, was officially marked by an inauguration ceremony on 20 May 2014. After a period of vessel leak-checking, beginning in the summer of 2014, the cryostat was evacuated, and magnet testing was completed in July 2015.

Operational phase 1 (OP1.1) began 10 December 2015. On that day the reactor successfully produced helium plasma (with temperatures of about 1 MK) for about 0.1 s. For this initial test with about 1 mg of helium gas injected into the evacuated plasma vessel, microwave heating was applied for a short 1.3 MW pulse.

The aim for the OP 1.1 was to conduct integrated testing of the most important systems as quickly as possible and to gain first experience with the physics of the machine.

More than 300 discharges with helium were done in December and January with gradually increasing temperatures finally reaching six million degrees Celsius, to clean the vacuum vessel walls and test the plasma diagnostic systems. Then, on 3 February 2016, production of the first hydrogen plasma initiated the science program. The highest temperature plasmas were produced by four-megawatt microwave heater pulses lasting one second; plasma electron temperatures reached 100 MK, while ion temperatures reached 10 MK. More than 2,000 pulses were conducted before shutdown.

Such tests were planned to continue for about a month, followed by a scheduled shut-down to open the vacuum vessel and line it with protective carbon tiles and install a "divertor" for removing impurities and heat from the plasma. The science program continued while gradually increasing discharge power and duration. The special magnetic field topology was confirmed in 2016.

Operational phase 1 (OP1.1) concluded 10 March 2016 and an upgrade phase began.

Operational phase 1 continued (OP1.2) in 2017 to test the (uncooled) divertor.

In June 2018 a record ion temperature of about 40 million degrees, a density of 0.8 × 1020 particles/m3, and a confinement time of 0.2 second yielded a record fusion product of 6 × 1026 degree-seconds per cubic metre.

During the last experiments of 2018, the density reached 2 × 1020 particles/m3 at a temperature of 20 million degrees. With good plasma values, long-lasting plasmas with long discharge times of 100 seconds were obtained. Energy content exceeded 1 megajoule.

In 2021 an analysis of X-ray imaging crystal spectrometer data collected in the 2018 experiment substantially reduced troubling neoclassical transport heat loss. Collisions between heated particles cause some to escape the magnetic field. This was due to magnetic field cage optimization that was essential in achieving the record results.

Timeline

Financing 
Financial support for the project is about 80% from Germany and about 20% from the European Union. 90% of German funding comes from the federal government and 10% from the state government of Mecklenburg-Vorpommern. The total investment for the stellarator itself over 1997–2014 amounted to €370 million, while the total cost for the IPP site in Greifswald including investment plus operating costs (personnel and material resources) amounted to €1.06 billion for that 18-year period. This exceeded the original budget estimate, mainly because the initial development phase was longer than expected, doubling the personnel costs.

In July 2011, the President of the Max Planck Society, Peter Gruss, announced that the United States would contribute $7.5 million under the program "Innovative Approaches to Fusion" of the United States Department of Energy.

Collaborating institutes

European Union 
 FJFI at Czech Technical University in Prague (Czech Republic)
 Charles University (Czech Republic)
 Technical University of Berlin (Germany)
 University of Greifswald (Germany)
 Forschungszentrum Jülich (Germany)
 Karlsruhe Institute of Technology (Germany)
 Institute of Interfacial Process Engineering and Plasma Technology (IGVP) at the University of Stuttgart (Germany)
 Physikalisch-Technische Bundesanstalt (Germany)
 Commissariat à l'énergie atomique et aux énergies alternatives (CEA; France)
 Centro de Investigaciones Energéticas, Medioambientales y Tecnológicas (CIEMAT; Spain)
 Institute of Nuclear Physics Kraków and National Centre for Nuclear Research (Poland)
 Institute of Plasma Physics and Laser Microfusion, Warsaw (Poland)
 KFKI Research Institute for Particle and Nuclear Physics of the Hungarian Academy of Sciences (Hungary)
 Trilateral Euregio Cluster (Germany/Belgium/Netherlands)
 Technical University of Denmark (DTU) (Denmark)
 Eindhoven University of Technology (The Netherlands)

United States 
 Los Alamos National Laboratory
 Oak Ridge National Laboratory
 Princeton Plasma Physics Laboratory
 University of Wisconsin–Madison
 Massachusetts Institute of Technology
 Auburn University
 Xantho Technologies, LLC

Japan 
 National Institute for Fusion Science

See also 

 Fusion power
 Similar stellarators:
Large Helical Device, Japan, Heliotron, superconducting (1998– )
 Helically Symmetric Experiment, USA, Quasi-Helically Symmetric
 National Compact Stellarator Experiment, three field-period Helias configuration – had similar coil problems – construction halted in 2008

References

External links

 
 

Stellarators
University of Greifswald
Nuclear technology in Germany
2015 in science